The Cabildo of Buenos Aires is the public building in Buenos Aires that was used as seat of the town council during the colonial era and the government house of the Viceroyalty of the Río de la Plata. Today the building is used as a museum.

History

Mayor Manuel de Frías proposed the building of the cabildo in what is now the Plaza de Mayo on March 3, 1608, since the government of the city lacked such a building. Its construction financed with taxes from the port of Buenos Aires, the building was finished in 1610 but was soon found to be too small and had to be expanded.

In 1682, due to lack of maintenance, the building was almost in ruins, and the construction was planned of a new cabildo that was two stories high and 11 arches wide. Construction of the new building did not start until 23 July 1725, was suspended in 1728, and restarted in 1731. Soon construction was, however, again suspended due to lack of funds.  The tower of the new cabildo was finished in 1764, yet even by the time of the May Revolution in 1810 the cabildo was still not completely finished.

In 1880 the architect Pedro Benoit raised the tower by 10 meters and with a dome covered with glazed tiles, instead of the traditional colonial red tiles. The tower was demolished nine years later in 1889 to create space for the Avenida de Mayo avenue and the three northernmost arches of the original eleven were demolished. In 1931, to create room for the Julio A. Roca avenue, the three southernmost arcs were removed, thereby restoring the central place of the tower, but leaving only five of the original arches.

In 1940, the architect Mario Buschiazzo reconstructed the colonial features of the Cabildo using various original documents.  The tower, the red tiles, the iron bars on the windows and the wooden windows and doors were all repaired.

National Museum of the Cabildo 
Currently, the cabildo hosts the National Museum of the Cabildo and the May Revolution (Museo Nacional del Cabildo y la Revolución de Mayo), in which paintings, artifacts, clothes and jewelry of the 18th century are on display. The patio of the cabildo still has its 1835 ornamental water well.

Gallery

References

External links

 Website of the Museo Nacional del Cabildo (in Spanish)
 CityMayors profile

Cabildos
Viceroyalty of the Río de la Plata
History of Buenos Aires
Buildings and structures in Buenos Aires
History museums in Argentina
Buildings and structures completed in 1610
National Historic Monuments of Argentina
Museums in Buenos Aires
1610 establishments in the Spanish Empire